Sergio Fernández may refer to:

Sergio Fernández González (rower) (born 1967), Argentine rower
Sergio Villanueva Fernández (born 1975), Spanish footballer
Sergio Fernández (footballer, born 1975), Spanish footballer
Sergio Fernández (footballer, born 1977), Spanish footballer
Sergio Fernández (hurdler) (born 1993), Spanish hurdler